Megachile similis is a species of bee in the family Megachilidae. It was described by Frederick Smith in 1879.

References

Similis
Insects described in 1879